Birdwatch may refer to:

 Birdwatch (magazine), a British monthly magazine for birdwatchers, established in 1992
 Birdwatch (fact checker), a feature of Twitter to fight misinformation, launched in 2021

See also
 BirdWatch Ireland, a conservation organisation
 Birdwatching (disambiguation)